Gregory "Greg" Jagenburg (born c. 1957) is an American former competition swimmer and a two-time world champion.  At the 1975 World Aquatics Championships in Cali, Colombia, he won gold medals in the 100-meter butterfly and the 4×100-meter medley relay, as well achieving a fourth place in the 200-meter butterfly.

See also
 List of World Aquatics Championships medalists in swimming (men)

References

1957 births
Living people
American male butterfly swimmers
World Aquatics Championships medalists in swimming
Swimmers at the 1975 Pan American Games

Pan American Games gold medalists for the United States
Pan American Games medalists in swimming
Medalists at the 1975 Pan American Games
20th-century American people
21st-century American people